Bolu Atatürk Stadium is a multi-purpose stadium in Bolu, Turkey. It is currently used mostly for football matches and is the home ground of Boluspor. The stadium holds 8,456 people and was built in 1958.

References

External links
 Atatürk Stadyumu at boluspor.org.tr

Football venues in Turkey
Sport in Bolu
Sports venues completed in 1958
Multi-purpose stadiums in Turkey
Athletics (track and field) venues in Turkey
Buildings and structures in Bolu Province
Boluspor
Things named after Mustafa Kemal Atatürk